Rust is an upcoming American Western film written and directed by Joel Souza. The film stars Alec Baldwin (who also produces, and co-wrote the story with Souza), Travis Fimmel, Brady Noon, Frances Fisher, and Jensen Ackles. 

In October 2021, production was temporarily suspended after a firearms shooting incident, in which cinematographer Halyna Hutchins was shot and killed when a gun being used as a prop was fired by Baldwin during the preparation for a scene; Souza was injured by the same projectile. Filming was set to resume in January 2023, more than a year after the incident and ongoing lawsuits, but Baldwin was charged with 2 counts of Involuntary manslaughter that month, putting his further involvement with the project into question. The filming resume date was then postponed to spring 2023.

Premise
In 1880s Kansas, aging outlaw Harland Rust comes out of hiding to rescue his thirteen-year-old grandson Lucas, after he is sentenced to hang for an accidental murder. Now fugitives, the pair have to outrun both Rust's nemesis, U.S. Marshal Wood Helm, and the vicious bounty hunter Fenton "Preacher" Lang.

Cast
 Alec Baldwin as Harland Rust
 Travis Fimmel as Fenton "Preacher" Lang
 Brady Noon as Lucas
 Frances Fisher as Lucas' great aunt
 Jensen Ackles as U.S. Marshal Wood Helm
 Devon Werkheiser

Production

Development
In May 2020, it was announced that Alec Baldwin would produce and star in Rust, a Western based on a story he created with writer and director Joel Souza. Baldwin told The Hollywood Reporter that he was elated to work with Souza after missing the opportunity to star in Crown Vic (2019). He compared the screenplay to the film Unforgiven (1992), and said it was inspired by a true story. When asked about his gun slinging and horse riding skills, he said: "They're always at the ready. I'm an actor of the old school. So if you read my resume – my motorcycle riding, my French, juggling, my horseback riding, my gunplay – is all right at my fingertips at all times."

Rust was being produced on a $6–7 million budget and has been described as a "passion project" for Baldwin. The film's distribution rights were sold to The Avenue for $2 million during the pre-production phase. Travis Fimmel, Brady Noon, and Frances Fisher joined the cast in September 2021, with Jensen Ackles being cast the following month. The production involved approximately 150 crew members, half of them local, 22 principal and 230 background actors from New Mexico. The production had a filming schedule of 21 days. Filming began in New Mexico on October 6, 2021.

Shooting incident

Spider bite incident 
In November 2021, weeks after the shooting incident, lamp operator and pipe rigger Jason Miller was bitten in the arm by a brown recluse spider while closing the set. Miller suffered necrosis and sepsis. He was hospitalized and underwent multiple surgeries to avoid amputation of his arm.

Resumed production
In October 2022, the Hutchins family settled the lawsuit, with filming set to resume in January 2023 in California, with Matthew Hutchins as an executive producer. Many of the film's crew gave mixed reactions towards the news, with some supporting it and planning on resuming their work on it, while others condemning the decision and deciding not to return. On January 18, filming was delayed again after New Mexico First Judicial District Attorney Mary Carmack-Altwies decided to charge Baldwin with involuntary manslaughter. In February 2023, it was reported that filming would resume in spring 2023 with Souza directing and Bianca Cline as cinematographer. Grant Hill was added as producer. The new shooting location was reported to be Yellowstone Film Ranch in Livingston, Montana. Producers stated that the use of working weapons or ammunition would be prohibited.

Release
Rust is scheduled to be released in the United States by The Avenue.

See also
 List of film and television accidents

Notes

References

External links
 

2020s American films
2020s English-language films
2020s Western (genre) films
American Western (genre) films
Films about capital punishment
Films about outlaws
Film controversies
Films produced by Grant Hill (producer)
Films set in Kansas
Films set in the 1880s
Films shot in Montana
Films shot in New Mexico
Upcoming films